Imran Khan is an Indian actor, director, writer and a producer in Bollywood films, television films, soap operas and commercials.

Early life
Khan was born in Mumbai.  Khan graduated from Mithibai College with a degree in commerce. He has been working in the film and television industry for 25 years.

Career

Film
Khan's first film as an actor was 1991's Inteha Pyar Ki starring Rishi Kapoor and Ruksar. He then worked in movies such as Sangam Hoke Rahega in 1994, Karamveer, Mohabbaton ka Safar in 1995, Big Brother, Heroine, Sooryavansham, Khiladiyon Ka Khiladi, Hawa, Dil Toh Baccha Hai Ji and 23rd March 1931: Shaheed.

Television
His first appearance in a TV series was Tara. This was followed by Dastaan, Parampara, Ajnabi, Nagin, Chandni, Aashirwad, Astitwa, Ammaji Ki Gali, Jiny and Jeeju, and I Love My India.

Imran Khan Productions has produced television films and TV serials such as Haya for Ary digital, and Nakhuda for Zee.

Filmography
Feature films

Inteha Pyar Ki (1992)
Karamveer (1993)
Sangam Ho Ke Rahega (1994)
Mohabbaton Kaa Safar (1995)
Khiladiyon Ka Khiladi Popo  (1996)
Sooryavansham (1999)
23rd March 1931: Shaheed (2002)
Hawa (2003)
Kismat (2004)
Bhola in Bollywood (2004)
Big Brother (2007)
Dil Toh Bachcha Hai Ji (2011)
Heroine (2012)

Television

 Vishwaas as Inspector Siddhanth
Humse Hai Liife as Principal Shenoy (2011)
Tara (1993) as Popo
Hero Uncle (1994)
Dastaan (Zee TV) (1995-1996)
Ajnabi (1996)
Naagin (1999) as Rahul
Devrani Jethani(1997)
Lakeerein (Zee Tv) 
Neeyat (Zee Tv)
Sssshhh...Phir Koi Hai as Krishna (Jai Shree Krishna)
Dharti Ka Veer Yodha Prithviraj Chauhan as AlhaNargis (DD national) Hamari Bahu Tulsi as AavishkarArjun (Star Plus)Ek Hazaaron Mein Meri Behna HaiBeintehaa (2014) as Rahim ChachaBeyhadh'' (2016)

References

Living people
Male actors from Mumbai
Male actors in Hindi cinema
Male actors in Hindi television
Mithibai College alumni
Year of birth missing (living people)